Pertiwi may refer to
Pertiwi (surname)
Ibu Pertiwi, a national personification of Indonesia 
Ibu Pertiwi (song), an Indonesian patriotic song of the 1950s-1960s 
Pertiwi Cup, a women's football competition in Indonesia 
2014 Pertiwi Cup
Purna Bhakti Pertiwi Museum in Indonesia 
Yayasan Kemanusiaan Ibu Pertiwi, an Indonesian non-profit organisation